Monica Rogati is a data scientist, computer scientist and the former Vice President of Data of Jawbone. Before that, she was a senior data scientist at LinkedIn.

Early life and education 
Rogati was born in Romania, where she attended the Tudor Vianu National College of Computer Science. Rogati has a B.S. in Computer Science from the University of New Mexico, and an MS and PhD in Computer Science from Carnegie Mellon University.

Career 
Rogati was Vice President of Data of Jawbone from 2013 to 2015. Previously, she was a senior data scientist at LinkedIn for five years, where she built the initial version of LinkedIn's job matching system and the first machine learning model for LinkedIn’s "People You May Know" feature. She is currently an equity partner at Data Collective (DCVC) and a scientific advisor to CrowdFlower.

Media 
Rogati has been interviewed and featured by the New York Times, Recode, and others. In 2014, she was named a "Big Data All-Star" by Fortune and was named one of the "100 Most Creative People in Business" by Fast Company. In 2013, she was named an "Enterprise Superstar" by VentureBeat.

References

External links 
 

Living people
Carnegie Mellon University alumni
Data scientists
Year of birth missing (living people)